George S. Junkins  was an American who served as the 30th Mayor of Lawrence, Massachusetts.

References

Footnotes

  

Mayors of Lawrence, Massachusetts
Year of death missing
Massachusetts Republicans
Year of birth missing